Aneta Kučmová (née Kladivová; born 22 May 2000) is a Czech tennis player.

She has been ranked by the Women's Tennis Association (WTA) as high as 473 in singles and 446 in doubles.

Kučmová won her first $60k title at the 2022 Macha Lake Open, in the doubles draw partnering Karolína Kubáňová.

ITF Circuit finals

Singles: 6 (3 titles, 3 runner-ups)

Doubles: 7 (4 titles, 3 runner-ups)

Notes

References

External links

2000 births
Living people
Czech female tennis players
21st-century Czech women